Isam Mostafa (born Cotrell J. Dennard, March 25, 1994), better known by his stage name Doe Boy, is an American rapper best known for his single "100 Shooters" with fellow rapper and label-mate Future.

Early life 
Isam Mostafa was born Cotrell J. Dennard on March 25, 1994, in Cleveland, Ohio.

Career
Doe Boy gained popularity after he released the track "Mini Vans" in October 2018. However, he wouldn't receive wide exposure until he released his single "Walk Down" in April 2019, which went viral after a video surfaced of NBA star LeBron James rapping to the song. This helped Doe Boy earn a remix of the track with YG.

In July 2019, Doe Boy released the single "100 Shooters" with Future, which had a feature from Meek Mill. Doe Boy was also featured on Young Thug's August 2019 track "I'm Scared" with 21 Savage.

In May 2020, Doe Boy released the single "Split It" with Moneybagg Yo.

In September 2022, Doe Boy was featured on Roddy Ricch's single "Ghetto Superstar" alongside G Herbo.

Discography

Mixtapes

Extended plays

Singles

As lead artist

As featured artist 
{| class="wikitable plainrowheaders" style="text-align:center;"
|+
!Title
!Year
!Album
|-
! scope="row"|"Nothin To Me"
|2020
|Days Inn

|+
Title
Year
Album
|-
! scope="row"|"Ghetto Superstar"
|2022

Other charted songs

References 

1994 births
Living people
21st-century American rappers
Rappers from Cleveland
American people convicted of burglary